The 1989 World Junior Ice Hockey Championships (1989 WJHC) was the 13th edition of the Ice Hockey World Junior Championship and was held in Anchorage, Alaska, United States at the Sullivan Arena.  The Soviet Union won the gold medal, its eighth, and ultimately final, championship.  Sweden won silver, and Czechoslovakia the bronze.

Final standings
The 1989 tournament was a round-robin format, with the top three teams winning gold, silver and bronze medals respectively.

West Germany was relegated to Pool B for 1990.

Results

Scoring leaders

Tournament awards

Qualification for Pool B
Because Denmark had used an ineligible player in last year's Pool C, a special challenge was played with Italy (who had come second).  The games were played in Canazei, Italy.

Pool B
Eight teams contested the second tier this year in Chamonix, France from March 19 to 28.  It was played in a simple round robin format, each team playing seven games.

Standings

Poland was promoted to Pool A and the Netherlands was relegated to Pool C for 1990.

Pool C
This five team tournament was a round robin played in Basingstoke, Great Britain from March 16 to 22.

Standings

Austria was promoted to Pool B for 1990.

References

 
 1989 World Junior Hockey Championships at TSN

1988 in Alaska
World Junior Ice Hockey Championships
1988–89 in British ice hockey
1988–89 in French ice hockey
1989 in Alaska
1980s in Hampshire
December 1988 sports events in the United States
Ice hockey in Alaska
International ice hockey competitions hosted by the United Kingdom
International ice hockey competitions hosted by the United States
International ice hockey competitions hosted by Italy
International ice hockey competitions hosted by France
January 1989 sports events in the United States
March 1989 sports events in Europe
Sport in Basingstoke
Sports in Anchorage, Alaska
Sports competitions in Alaska
World Junior Ice Hockey Championships